Out Of Hate is a third album by Made Of Hate. It was recorded in 2012/2013 at HZ Studio.

Music and lyrics were written by Michał "Mike" Kostrzyński.

Songs
 01. Off The Grid
 02. Me, Myself
 03. Broken Man
 04. Torn
 05. Here And Now
 06. The Ones
 07. Wrath
 08. Chosen Ones
 09. Origin

Line Up
 Michał "Mike" Kostrzyński - Guitars
 Radosław Półrolniczak - Vocals
 Marlena Rutkowska - Bass
 Tomasz Grochowski - Drums

2014 albums